|}
{| class="collapsible collapsed" cellpadding="0" cellspacing="0" style="clear:right; float:right; text-align:center; font-weight:bold;" width="280px"
! colspan="3" style="border:1px solid black; background-color: #77DD77;" | Also Ran

The 1992 Epsom Derby was a horse race which took place at Epsom Downs on Wednesday 3 June 1992. It was the 213th running of the Derby, and it was won by Dr Devious. The winner was ridden by John Reid and trained by Peter Chapple-Hyam. The pre-race favourite Rodrigo de Triano finished ninth.

Race details
 Sponsor: Ever Ready
 Winner's prize money: £355,000
 Going: Good (Good to Soft in last 4 furlongs)
 Number of runners: 18
 Winner's time: 2m 36.19s

Full result

* The distances between the horses are shown in lengths or shorter. shd = short-head; hd = head; nk = neck.† Trainers are based in Great Britain unless indicated.

Winner's details
Further details of the winner, Dr Devious:

 Foaled: 10 March 1989, in Ireland
 Sire: Ahonoora; Dam: Rose of Jericho (Alleged)
 Owner: Sidney H. Craig
 Breeder: Lyonstown Stud
 Rating in 1992 International Classifications: 125

Form analysis

Two-year-old races
Notable runs by the future Derby participants as two-year-olds in 1991.

 Dr Devious – 2nd Coventry Stakes, 1st Superlative Stakes, 1st Vintage Stakes, 1st Dewhurst Stakes
 St Jovite – 1st Anglesey Stakes, 1st Futurity Stakes, 4th Grand Critérium
 Twist and Turn – 3rd Royal Lodge Stakes
 Alflora – 4th Washington Singer Stakes
 Great Palm – 2nd Dewhurst Stakes
 Rodrigo de Triano – 1st Washington Singer Stakes, 1st Champagne Stakes, 1st Middle Park Stakes
 Thourios – 5th Vintage Stakes, 3rd Dewhurst Stakes, 7th Racing Post Trophy
 Rainbow Corner – 2nd Prix La Rochette, 2nd Grand Critérium
 Assessor – 3rd Washington Singer Stakes, 3rd Racing Post Trophy
 Ninja Dancer – 1st Autumn Stakes, 5th Racing Post Trophy

The road to Epsom
Early-season appearances in 1992 and trial races prior to running in the Derby.

 Dr Devious – 2nd Craven Stakes, 7th Kentucky Derby
 St Jovite – 4th Gladness Stakes, 1st Derrinstown Stud Derby Trial
 Silver Wisp – 3rd Easter Stakes, 4th 2,000 Guineas
 Muhtarram – 4th Craven Stakes, 5th 2,000 Guineas
 Twist and Turn – 1st Feilden Stakes, 1st Chester Vase
 Alflora – 5th Greenham Stakes, 7th Sandown Classic Trial, 5th Dante Stakes
 Alnasr Alwasheek – 1st Craven Stakes, 9th 2,000 Guineas, 1st Dante Stakes
 Great Palm – 2nd Dante Stakes
 Rodrigo de Triano – 4th Greenham Stakes, 1st 2,000 Guineas, 1st Irish 2,000 Guineas
 Thourios – 7th 2,000 Guineas
 Rainbow Corner – 1st Prix de Fontainebleau, 2nd Poule d'Essai des Poulains
 Assessor – 3rd Sandown Classic Trial, 1st Lingfield Derby Trial
 Pollen Count – 1st Sandown Classic Trial
 Ninja Dancer – 8th Feilden Stakes, 5th Predominate Stakes
 Young Freeman – 4th Predominate Stakes

Subsequent Group 1 wins
Group 1 / Grade I victories after running in the Derby.

 Dr Devious – Irish Champion Stakes (1992)
 St Jovite – Irish Derby (1992), King George VI and Queen Elizabeth Stakes (1992)
 Muhtarram – Irish Champion Stakes (1993), Premio Presidente della Repubblica (1994)
 Great Palm – Premio Presidente della Repubblica (1993)
 Rodrigo de Triano – International Stakes (1992), Champion Stakes (1992)
 Assessor – Prix Royal-Oak (1992), Prix du Cadran (1993)

Subsequent breeding careers
Leading progeny of participants in the 1992 Epsom Derby.

Sires of Group/Grade One winners
<div style="font-size:85%">
Dr Devious (1st) – Stood in Japan, Ireland and Italy
 Collier Hill – 1st Irish St. Leger (2005)
 Kinnaird – 1st Prix de l'Opéra (2005) Dam of Berkshire (1st Royal Lodge Stakes 2013)
 London Bridge – 2nd Oka Sho (1998) Dam of Daiwa El Cielo (1st Yushun Himba 2004)
 Demophilos – 2nd St Leger Stakes (2001)
St Jovite (2nd)
 Amerique – 1st San Juan Capistrano Handicap (1998)
 Saint's Honor – 1st San Fernando Breeders' Cup (2000)
 Equerry – 3rd Eclipse Stakes (2002)
 Baranja – 3rd Premio Regina Elena (2001)
</div>

Sires of National Hunt horses
Alflora (6th)
 Wishfull Thinking – 1st Old Roan Chase (2014)
 What A Friend – 1st totesport Bowl (2010)
 Farmer Jack – 1st Aon Chase (2005)
 Central House – 1st Paddy Power Dial-A-Bet Chase (2004)
Great Palm (8th)
 Great Love – 1st Prix Alain du Breil (2002)
 Rock And Palm – 1st Prix La Barka (2005)
 Donnas Palm – 1st Tara Hurdle (2009)
 Great Jane – Dam of Galop Marin (1st Grand Prix d'Automne 2018,2019)
Assessor (13th)
 Anibale Fly – 2nd Cheltenham Gold Cup (2019)
 My Way de Solzen – 1st Long Walk Hurdle (2005)
 Reve de Sivola – 1st Long Walk Hurdle (2012, 2013, 2014)
 Coo Star Sivola – 1st Ultima Handicap Chase (2018)

Other Stallions
Rodrigo De Triano (9th) – Erimo Excel (1st Yushun Himba 1998), Super Hornet (2nd Mile Championship 2007,2008), Rodrigo Rose (3rd Winter Stakes 2004)Muhtarram (4th) – Fight Your Corner (1st Henry II Stakes 2005), Muakaad (1st Meld Stakes 2001), Maycocks Bay (Dam of Sariska)Twist and Turn (5th) – Exported to IndiaAlnasr Alwasheek (7th) – Minor flat winners – Exported to IndiaRainbow Corner (11th) – Exported to Argentina – Exported to Brazil (sperm used for polo horses)Pollen Count (16th) – Exported to Zimbabwe

References

External links
 Colour Chart – Derby 1992''

Epsom Derby
 1992
Epsom Derby
20th century in Surrey
Epsom Derby